

Overview 
Helicopter Maritime Strike Squadron SEVEN EIGHT (HSM-78) "Blue Hawks" is a United States Navy helicopter squadron based at Naval Air Station North Island in San Diego, California. HSM-78 was established on March 1, 2012 and is currently assigned to "Team Broadsword" of Carrier Air Wing 2. The squadron operates the Sikorsky MH-60R Seahawk helicopter and deploys on ships (aircraft carriers, cruisers, and destroyers) assigned to the Carl Vinson Carrier Strike Group.

The squadron's Plain Language Address is: HELMARSTRIKERON SEVEN EIGHT

Photo Gallery

History

Command Namesake 
The "Blue Hawks" name dates back to 1977 when the original "Blue Hawks" of Helicopter Attack Squadron (Light) Five were established. HA(L)-5 continued the warrior legacy of Helicopter Attack Squadron (Light) Three (HAL-3) who served courageously during the Vietnam War. The current "Blue Hawks" of HSM-78 continue to grow the legend and the proud heritage of those warriors who went before them.

Commanding Officers

Operational History: Deployments and Major Exercises 

 The squadron participated in the Rim of the Pacific (RIMPAC) Exercise 2014 aboard .
 On October 16, 2014, HSM-78 Detachment 3 returned from a 7-month deployment aboard .
 On January 9, 2015, a HSM-78 Detachment 4 returned from a 7-month deployment to the Western Pacific and the Indian Ocean, participating in RIMPAC, Valiant Shield, and Keen Sword exercises, aboard .
 The squadron conducted a Southern Seas deployment aboard  in 2015.
 On April 26, 2017, an MH-60R Seahawk of HSM-78 crashed off the coast of Guam during a deployment to the Western Pacific on the guided missile destroyer . All three crew members were safely recovered.
 On June 22, 2017, the squadron returned from a 6-month deployment to the U.S. 7th Fleet area of responsibility.
 On April 12, 2018, the squadron returned from a 3-month deployment to the Western Pacific.
 A squadron detachment participated in Silent Forces Exercise (SIFOREX) in April 2018 aboard  in the U.S. 4th Fleet area of responsibility.
 The squadron participated in the Rim of the Pacific (RIMPAC) Exercise 2018 aboard .
 In July 2019, the squadron participated in Exercise Northern Strike 2019 at the Alpena Combat Readiness Training Center, located in the National All-Domain Warfighting Center in northern Michigan.
In August 2021, the squadron deployed with the Carl Vinson Carrier Strike Group on the first deployment with the F-35C and CMV-22, dubbed as the "Air Wing of the Future."

Squadron Awards 

 On May 16, 2019, the squadron was awarded the Admiral J.S. "Jimmy" Thach Award at the Naval Helicopter Association (NHA) National Symposium for outstanding achievement and contribution to Naval Aviation. The squadron was also awarded the Battle Effectiveness (Battle "E") Award for achieving the highest standards of cost-wise and performance readiness, recognizing the unit's training and operational achievements while including a balance that incentivizes effectiveness and cost-wise readiness.
 On October 2, 2020, the Navy and Marine Corps Public Health Center announced that HSM-78 was awarded the Blue H Navy Surgeon General's Health Promotion and Wellness Award, at the Gold Star level, for excellence in workplace health promotion policies, activities, and outcomes.
 On March 17, 2021, the Blue Hawks were awarded the Chief of Naval Operations (CNO) Aviation Safety Award for Fiscal Year 2020 for their "exceptional professionalism, commitment to excellence, solid leadership and teamwork, the high-velocity outcomes and in-depth risk management culture which resulted in safe and effective operations." The same day, the squadron was also awarded the Commander, US Pacific Fleet Retention Excellence Award for Fiscal Year 2020.
 On March 30, 2022, the squadron was awarded the Battle "E" Award for calendar year 2021, her second award.

Major Personnel Achievements 
 Aviation Maintenance Administrationman 1st Class (AW/SW) Sania Mendez was a finalist for the Commander, Naval Air Force, U.S. Pacific Fleet 2013 Sea Sailor of the Year
 On January 15, 2020, Yeoman Third Class (AW) John Norman was awarded the United Service Organization’s (USO) Service Member of the Year.
 On July 24, 2020, the squadron's fourth Commanding Officer, Matthew R. Barr became the first ever rotary wing aviator to become a Carrier Air Wing Commander, or "CAG," when he assumed command of Carrier Air Wing ONE (CVW-1).

HSM-78 Official Links 

 Official Command Website
 Official Command Facebook
 Official Command Instagram
 Official Command YouTube

References 
 

Military units and formations in California
Helicopter maritime strike squadrons of the United States Navy
